MS Roald Amundsen is a new hybrid powered Hurtigruten expedition cruise ship. She was built by Kleven Yards of Norway and started her maiden voyage on 3 July 2019 from the Norwegian port Tromsø to Hamburg. She and her sister ship  are the first hybrid-powered ships in the Hurtigruten fleet.

Roald Amundsen was christened in fall 2019 in Antarctica with a chunk of ice instead of the traditional bottle of champagne. The vessel has Polar Class 6 rating for arctic conditions. Roald Amundsen was the first hybrid ship to sail the Northwest Passage.

Construction and career 
Roald Amundsen was launched on 17 February 2018. In late February 2018, Hurtigruten announced that the company would not take delivery of Roald Amundsen until 2019 because of problems at the shipyard.

In 2019, the ship began expedition cruises along the Norwegian Coast, as well as trips to the North and South Poles. During the evening of 10 September 2019, Roald Amundsen arrived in Nome, Alaska, captained by Kai Albrigtsen, and the operator announced the first complete passage of the more than  passage from the Atlantic Ocean to the Pacific Ocean, by hybrid propulsion.

Coronavirus pandemic 

Upon arrival at Tromsø, four crew members, including the two isolated ones, were tested for coronavirus, and the University Hospital of North Norway (UNN) announced that all four had tested positive for COVID-19. As a result, all 160 crew members were to be tested.

Many passengers had already disembarked and had been making their way home before the news broke about the infected crew, with one bus driver stating that he had driven 28 passengers from Roald Amundsen to the airport hours before the news broke.  Hurtigruten stated that they would inform the passengers of both cruises about their potential exposure to the virus via SMS.  There were 209 passengers aboard the  cruise, and 177 aboard the  cruise.

However, Hurtigruten had believed there was no need to worry.

One report stated that passengers on the second sailing were not advised that COVID-19 infection had been found on the ship. Others said they had learned about it later from the news reports.

All 177 passengers aboard the  cruise and all 160 crew members were required to enter quarantine.  Roald Amundsen was originally scheduled to set sail for Svalbard again that afternoon, but the cruise was cancelled, and the ship's next planned voyage was scheduled for the beginning of September.

Later that evening, Mayor Wilhelmsen confirmed that 36 people had tested positive so far, including one passenger. The mayor disapproved of how Hurtigruten had handled the situation, stating that he believed the passengers should have been informed and quarantined before the ship had docked in Tromsø, and that he worried that a major outbreak might occur because passengers had wandered around the city before they were notified about the sick crew members. Troms Parliament Member Kent Gudmundsen expressed shock over Hurtigruten's management of the situation, and Minister of Health and Care Services Bent Høie praised the efforts of Tromsø and the NIPH in containing the virus. Up to 69 municipalities might have been affected by the outbreak, and officials had still been unable to contact 20 of the 177 passengers aboard the  cruise by evening.

An update on 3 August 2020 stated that four of the passengers who were on the two cruises had tested positive for the virus.

Notes

References

External links
 Hurtigruten ASA Official homepage - MS Roald Amundsen

Passenger ships of Norway
Hurtigruten
2018 ships
Cruise ships involved in the COVID-19 pandemic